MTV Live may refer to:

Television
MTV Live (TV network), an American music cable network known as Palladia from 2008 until early 2016 and Music: High Definition (MHD) from 2006 to 2008
MTV Live (International TV channel), a series of international networks mainly carrying music videos and live music programming
MTV Live (American TV program), a daily MTV series carried from 1997 until 1998 and one of two forerunner shows to Total Request Live
MTV Live (Canadian TV program), a talk show, on air from 2006 to 2012

See also
 List of MTV series albums
 MTV Ao Vivo (disambiguation)